Casino Royale: Original Motion Picture Soundtrack. The soundtrack to the 2006 film Casino Royale was released by Sony Classical on 14 November 2006. The music was composed by David Arnold and is Arnold's fourth soundtrack for the popular James Bond movie series. Frequent collaborator Nicholas Dodd orchestrated and conducted the score.

Development
Producers Michael G. Wilson and Barbara Broccoli announced on 26 July 2006 that Chris Cornell, the former Audioslave and Soundgarden lead singer, composed and would sing "You Know My Name", the Casino Royale title song.  Cornell collaborated with David Arnold who composed the film's score. Cornell was first reported to be writing and performing the song on 20 July 2006 by the Finnish newspaper IltaАЬА-Sanomat. "You Know My Name" is the first theme song since 1983's Octopussy to use a different title than the film, and Cornell is the first male performer since a-ha (in 1987's The Living Daylights). It is only the fourth Bond theme (after the opening medley of Dr. No, the instrumental theme from On Her Majesty's Secret Service and "All Time High" from Octopussy) to make no reference to the title of the film. The soundtrack was completed early in the morning on 11 October 2006. The soundtrack was released on 14 November 2006.

Various names were reported in the media prior to the announcement, some reports going so far as to have the performers apparently claim they were working on the theme. This list includes Tina Turner who previously sang "GoldenEye" for the 1995 Bond film of the same name, and Tony Christie.

Title song and tracks
The Casino Royale title song "You Know My Name" by Chris Cornell is not featured on the soundtrack album, but released separately as a single. However, motifs from the song serve as Bond's theme throughout the film, e.g. the tracks "I'm the Money" and "Aston Montenegro", feature two different instrumental renditions of its chorus. The "You Know My Name" CD single was released on 11 December 2006.

Some cues for the movie that did not make the final selection of tracks for the soundtrack album are available as bonus track downloads in iTunes from the iTunes Store.

The traditional James Bond Theme builds throughout the film before appearing in its full form over the end credits as track 25, "The Name's Bond . . . James Bond", on the official album.

Track listing

See also
 Outline of James Bond

References

External links
 Casino Royale:Score Review

Soundtrack albums from James Bond films
Soundtrack
2006 soundtrack albums
David Arnold soundtracks
Sony Classical Records soundtracks